Archidemis is a genus of moths belonging to the subfamily Tortricinae of the family Tortricidae.

Species
Archidemis anastea Diakonoff, 1968

See also
List of Tortricidae genera

References

 , 2005: World catalogue of insects volume 5 Tortricidae.
 , 1968 Microlepidoptera of the Philippine Islands. United States National Museum Bulletin, 257: 7-100, 300-337, 414-425. Full article:

External links
tortricidae.com

Archipini
Monotypic moth genera
Tortricidae genera
Taxa named by Alexey Diakonoff